Presidential elections were held in Mali on 11 May 1997. They were boycotted by the main opposition parties and saw incumbent president Alpha Oumar Konaré of the Alliance for Democracy in Mali re-elected with 84.4% of the vote, although turnout was just 29%.

Results

References

Mali
1997 in Mali
Presidential elections in Mali